The Cessna T-41 Mescalero is a military version of the popular Cessna 172, operated by the United States Air Force and Army, as well as the armed forces of various other countries as a pilot-training aircraft.

Design and development

In 1964, the US Air Force (USAF) decided to use the off-the-shelf Cessna 172F as a lead-in aircraft for student pilots rather than starting them out in the T-37 jet aircraft.  The USAF ordered 237 T-41As from Cessna. The first USAF class (67-A) of students began training on the T-41 from the civilian airport in Big Spring, Texas, in August 1965.

The T-41B was the US Army version, with a  Continental IO-360 engine and constant-speed propeller in place of the  Continental O-300 and 7654 fixed-pitch propeller used in the 172 and the T-41A.

In 1968, the USAF acquired 52 of the more powerful T-41Cs, which used  Continental IO-360 and a fixed-pitch climb propeller, for use at the Air Force Academy in Colorado Springs.

In 1996, the aircraft were further upgraded to the T-41D, which included an upgrade in avionics and to a constant-speed propeller.

Beginning in 1993, the USAF replaced many of the T-41 fleet with the Slingsby T-3A Firefly for the flight-screening role, and for aerobatic training, which was outside the design capabilities of the T-41. The T-3A fleet was indefinitely grounded in 1997 and scrapped in 2006 following a series of fatal accidents at the US Air Force Academy.

The USAF now trains all its prospective pilots and combat systems officers through a civilian contract with DOSS Aviation known as initial military flight screening, which makes use of the Diamond DA20.  This program is conducted for USAF line officer accession programs (e.g., USAFA, AFROTC, and OTS), with said training taking place after these officers have been commissioned as second lieutenants.  It is also conducted for USAF officers at the first lieutenant and captain level selected for flight training after an assignment as a nonaeronautically rated officer.

Four T-41s remain at the Air Force Academy for the USAFA Flying Team, as well as to support certain academic classes.

A number of air forces, including Saudi Arabia and Singapore, purchased various civilian models of the Cessna 172 for use in military training, transport, and liaison roles. While similar to the T-41, these aircraft were not T-41s and were powered by the standard 172 powerplants available in the model year purchased. These included the  Continental O-300 in pre-1968 aircraft and the 150 and  Lycoming O-320 in later 172s.

Variants

T-41A
United States Air Force version of the Cessna 172F for undergraduate pilot training, powered by 145 hp Continental O-300, 211 built
T-41B
United States Army version of the Cessna R172E for training and liaison duties, powered by 210 hp Continental IO-360, 255 built
T-41C
A version of the T-41B for use by the USAF Academy, powered by 210 hp Continental IO-360, 52 built
T-41D
A version of the T-41B for export under the Military Aid Program with 28 V electrical system and simplified equipment, powered by 210 hp Continental IO-360, 238 built, first T-41D delivered to the Philippine Air Force in 1968

Operators

Angolan Air Force (5× Cessna 172 in service)

Argentine Army Aviation (10× T-41D in service)

Bolivian Air Force

Chilean Air Force (10× T-41D, already retired)

Colombian Air Force (30× T-41D) - retired

Dominican Air Force (10× T-41D / R172),

Ecuadorian Air Force (8× T-41A, 12× T-41D)

Salvadoran Air Force

Hellenic Air Force (T-41A, 21× T-41D, retired )

Honduran Air Force (3× T-41B and 6× T-41D, retired)

Indonesian Air Force (55× T-41D)

Imperial Iranian Air Force (T-41D)

Khmer Air Force (22× T-41D).
 Kingdom of Laos
Royal Lao Air Force (T-41B, T-41D)

Armed Forces of Liberia (T-41D)

Pakistani Air Force (T-41D)

Paraguayan Air Force (5× T-41B, retired)

Peruvian Air Force (25× T-41A

Philippine Air Force (20× T-41D)

Republic of Korea Air Force (15× T-41D)

Republic of Vietnam Air Force (22× T-41D, no longer in service)

Royal Thai Air Force (6× T-41D)
Royal Thai Army (6× T-41B)

Turkish Air Force (30× T-41D)
Turkish Land Forces (25× T-41D)

United States Army (255× T-41B)
United States Air Force (211× T-41A and 52× T-41C)
 Jacksonville Navy Flying Club/NAS Jacksonville, Florida - 2 x T-41A, 1 x T-41B (two currently airworthy)
 Kirtland AFB Aeroclub/Kirtland AFB, New Mexico - 5 x T-41C (all 5 currently airworthy)
 Patuxent River Navy Flying Club/NAS Patuxent River, Maryland - 3 x T-41C (1 currently airworthy)
Eglin AFB Aeroclub/Eglin AFB, FL - 2 x T-41A, 1 x T-41B (1 T-41A and 1 T-41B currently airworthy)
 Travis AFB Aero Club/Travis AFB, CA - 1 x T-41C (currently airworthy)
 Dover AFB Aero Club/Dover AFB, DE - 2 x T-41A, 1x T-41C (currently airworthy)

Uruguayan Air Force (7× T-41D)

Aircraft on display
United States
 65-5168 – T-41A on static display in the airpark at Vance Air Force Base in Enid, Oklahoma.
 65-5226 – T-41 on static display at Randolph Air Force Base, Universal City, Texas. It is on display in park area adjacent to Randolph Inn Visiting Officers Quarters (VOQ) / Distinguished Visiting Officers Quarters (DVOQ) along with other historical ATC and AETC aircraft.
 65-5251 – T-41A on static display at the National Museum of the United States Air Force in Dayton, Ohio. This aircraft was previously assigned to the United States Air Force Academy inventory.
 67-14977 – T-41A on static display as part of the Officer Training School complex at Maxwell Air Force Base in Montgomery, Alabama.

Specifications (T-41C)

See also

References

External links

 Global Security: T-41 Mescalero

T-41
1960s United States military trainer aircraft
Single-engined tractor aircraft
High-wing aircraft
Aircraft first flown in 1964